Ned Ludd is the legendary person to whom the Luddites attributed the name of their movement.

In 1779, Ludd is supposed to have broken two stocking frames in a fit of rage. When the "Luddites" emerged in the 1810s, his identity was appropriated to become the folkloric character of Captain Ludd, also known as King Lud or General Ludd, the Luddites' alleged leader and founder.

Origin of the name Ludd
It has been claimed that the name 'Ned Ludd' came from an 'Edward Ludlam' who was buried at St Mary's Church, Anstey.

History
Supposedly, Ludd was a weaver from Anstey, near Leicester, England. In 1779, after either being whipped for idleness or taunted by local youths, he smashed two knitting frames in what was described as a "fit of passion". This story can be traced to an article in The Nottingham Review on 20 December 1811, but there is no independent evidence of its veracity. John Blackner's book History of Nottingham, also published in 1811, provides a variant tale, of a lad called "Ludlam" who was told by his father, a framework-knitter, to "square his needles". Ludlam took a hammer and "beat them into a heap". News of the incident spread, and whenever frames were sabotaged, people would jokingly say "Ned Ludd did it".

By 1812, organised frame-breakers became known as Luddites, using the name King Ludd or Captain Ludd for their mythical leader. Letters and proclamations were signed by "Ned Ludd".

In popular culture

Music
The character of Ned Ludd is commemorated in the folk ballad "The Triumph of General Ludd". Chumbawamba recorded a version of this song on their 2003 release, English Rebel Songs 1381–1984.
 The Fall's song "Ludd Gang" (the b-side to "The Man Whose Head Expanded") is about Ned Ludd.
Robert Calvert wrote and recorded another song "Ned Ludd", which appeared on his 1985 album Freq; which includes the lyrics:
They said Ned Ludd was an idiot boyThat all he could do was wreck and destroy, andHe turned to his workmates and said: Death to MachinesThey tread on our future and they stamp on our dreams.
Steeleye Span's 2006 album Bloody Men has a five-part section on the subject of Ned Ludd.
The Heaven Shall Burn song "The Final March" has a direct reference to Captain Ludd.
Alt-country band The Gourds affectionately refer to Ned Ludd as "Uncle Ned" in the song "Luddite Juice" from their 2009 release, Haymaker.
The Scottish folk musician Alasdair Roberts sings of Ned Ludd in his song "Ned Ludd's Rant (For World Rebarbarised)" on his 2009 album, Spoils.
San Diego punk band The Night Marchers included a song called "Ned Lud" on their 2013 release Allez, Allez.
Neil Hannon of The Divine Comedy (band) references Ned Ludd in the song "You'll Never Work in This Town Again" on their 2019 release, Office Politics.

Literature
Edmund Cooper's alternative-history The Cloud Walker is set in a world where the Luddite ethos has given rise to a religious hierarchy which dominates English society and sets carefully prescribed limits on technology. A hammer – the tool supposedly used by Ned Ludd – is a religious symbol, and Ned Ludd is seen as a divine, messianic figure.
 The Fall of the Gas-Lit Empire, a steam-punk trilogy by Rod Duncan, describes a hypothetical world nearly 200 years after a successful Luddite revolution. The powerful and corrupt International Patent Office controls and restricts technological progress and Ned Ludd is given a similar status to Henry Ford in Brave New World.
The novel The Monkey Wrench Gang (1975), by Edward Abbey, is dedicated to Ned Ludd.
Anne Finger wrote a collection of short stories titled Call Me Ahab about famous disabled historical and literary figures, which included the story "Our Ned" about Ned Ludd.
Ecodefense: A Field Guide To Monkeywrenching was published by Ned Ludd Books. Much of the content came from the "Dear Ned Ludd" column in the newsletter of the group Earth First!.
In the comic book series Superman Unchained, a terrorist group called Ascension opposing modern technology uses the image of Ludd in its broadcasts.
The Luddites were the inspiration for the play The Machine Breakers (Die Maschinenstürmer) by the German playwright Ernst Toller (1893–1939).
Ned Ludd is a character in the novel The Twelfth Enchantment by David Liss.

Television
In NBC's The Blacklist, episode 8 of season 1, an activist network that plans an attack on the US financial system is led by a man who calls himself General Ludd.
On the Disney Channel's Big Hero 6: The Series, there is a recurring character named Ned Ludd who lives in the woods and abhors modern technology.

Games 
 In Sarah Northway's Rebuild: Gangs of Deadsville, one of the factions is a group called The Luddies led by a man dubbed King Ludd Owen. The group is described as "part hippie, part luddite" and is an obvious reference to Ned Ludd and the Luddites.
 In the game Starsector, a faction called the Luddic Church whose founding is based on the sacrifice of their quasi-mythical martyr, Ludd, and values are described in game as being a "life lived more simply, of agrarian virtue and humanistic values and prayer against the violence and technological alienation", and their extremist offshoot, the Luddic Path, who outright proscribe any use of higher technology were inspired by Ned Ludd and the Luddites.

Other 
 The Ned Ludd, a craft beer pub on Friar Lane, Nottingham, is named after Ned Ludd.
A small American craft-kitchen restaurant located in Portland, Oregon, US, is called Ned Ludd.
A popular bookstore/winebar in Antwerp, Belgium is called 'luddites'.

See also
Captain Swing
Rebecca Riots

Notes

18th-century English people
Anonymity pseudonyms
British weavers
English folklore
People from Anstey, Leicestershire
People of the Industrial Revolution
People whose existence is disputed